Antyesti (IAST: Antyeṣṭi) literally means "last sacrifice", and refers to the funeral rites for the dead in Hinduism, which usually involves cremation of the body. This rite of passage is the last samskara in a series of traditional life cycle samskaras that start from conception in Hindu tradition. It is also referred to as Antima Sanskar, Antya-kriya, Anvarohanyya, or as Vahni Sanskara.

The details of the Antyesti ceremony depend on the region, social group, gender and age of the dead.

Etymology
Antyeṣṭi (अन्त्येष्टि) is a composite Sanskrit word of antya and iṣṭi, which respectively mean "last" and "sacrifice". Together, the word means the "last sacrifice". Similarly, the phrase Antima Sanskara literally means "last sacred ceremony, or last rite of passage".

Scriptures

The Antyesti  rite of passage is structured around the premise in ancient literature of Hinduism that the microcosm of all living beings is a reflection of a macrocosm of the universe. The soul (Atman, Brahman) is the essence and immortal that is released at the Antyeshti ritual, but both the body and the universe are vehicles and transitory in various schools of Hinduism. The human body and the universe consist of five elements in Hindu texts – air, water, fire, earth and space. The last rite of passage returns the body to the five elements and its origins. The roots of this belief are found in the Vedas, for example in the hymns of Rigveda in section 10.16, as follows,

The final rites of a burial, in case of untimely death of a child, is rooted in Rig Veda's section 10.18, where the hymns mourn the death of the child, praying to deity Mrityu to "neither harm our girls nor our boys", and pleads the earth to cover, protect the deceased child as a soft wool.

Antyesti practices

The ceremonial offerings varies across the spectrum of Hindu society. Some of the popular rituals followed in Vedic religions after the death of a human being, for his or her peace and ascent to heaven are as follows.

Shmashana - the cremation ground

The cremation ground is called Shmashana (in Sanskrit), and it is located near a river, if not on the river bank itself. Those who can afford it may go to special sacred places like Kashi (Varanasi), Haridwar, Prayagraj (also known as Allahabad), Sri Rangam, Brahmaputra on the occasion of Ashokastami and Rameswaram to complete this rite of immersion of ashes into water.

Cremation rituals 

The last rites are usually completed within a day of death. While practices vary among sects, generally, his or her body is washed, wrapped in white cloth, if the dead is a man or a widow, or red cloth, if it is a woman whose husband is still alive, the big toes are tied together with a string and a Tilak (red, yellow or white mark) is placed on the forehead. The dead adult's body is carried to the cremation ground near a river or water, by family and friends, and placed on a pyre with feet facing south.

The eldest son, or a male mourner, or a priest – called the lead cremator or lead mourner – then bathes himself before leading the cremation ceremony. He circumambulates the dry wood pyre with the body, says a eulogy or recites a hymn, places sesame seeds or rice in the dead person's mouth, sprinkles the body and the pyre with ghee (clarified butter), then draws three lines signifying Yama (deity of the dead), Kala ('Time', deity of cremation and finality) and the dead. Prior to lighting the pyre, an earthen pot is filled with water, and the lead mourner circles the body with it, before lobbing the pot over his shoulder so it breaks near the head. Once the pyre is ablaze, the lead mourner and the closest relatives may circumambulate the burning pyre one or more times. The ceremony is concluded by the lead cremator, during the ritual, is kapala kriya, or the ritual of piercing the burning skull with a stave (bamboo fire poker) to make a hole or break it, in order to release the spirit.

All those who attend the cremation, and are exposed to the dead body or cremation smoke take a shower as soon as possible after the cremation, as the cremation ritual is considered unclean and polluting. The cold collected ash from the cremation is later consecrated to the nearest river or sea.

In some regions, the male relatives of the deceased shave their head and invite all friends and relatives, on the tenth or twelfth day, to eat a simple meal together in remembrance of the deceased. This day, in some communities, also marks a day when the poor and needy are offered food in memory of the dead.

Modern cremation methods 

Both manual bamboo wood pyres and electric cremation are used for Hindu cremations. For the latter, the body is kept on a bamboo frame on rails near the door of the electric chamber. After cremation, the mourner will collect the ashes and consecrate it to a water body, such as a river or sea.

Burial in Hinduism 

Apart from the cremation method, several sects in Hinduism follow the practice of burial of the dead. In some sects, the important gurus, swamis or sadhus are buried. The preparatory rituals are more or less similar to cremation viz, washing the body, applying vibuthi or chandam on the forehead of the deceased etc., but instead of cremating, the deceased is buried. The body is either placed in sleeping position or in some Shaivite and tribal traditions is in Padmasana sitting position with legs folded and arms resting on the thigh simulating meditative position. The burial pit is prepared in the community burial ground called Shamshana, usually situated outside the city or village.  Some affluent will bury their dead in their own field. The burial pit for sleeping position is generally three feet width and six feet in length and for sitting position it is three feet by three feet.  As a thumb rule in all the sects invariable the saints are buried in sitting position in a separate place where later on a Samadhi is built which becomes a place of worship. For example, followers of Ayyavazhi sect bury the body, facing the geographic north in a padmasana position, without coffins and it is covered by sand or Namam (sacred soil) as an act austerity for the unfolding of Dharma Yukam.

Post Antyesti rituals 

Other Indian rituals after death include Niravapanjali, Tarpana, Śrāddha, Rasam Pagri, Pitru Paksha.

Genealogy registers 

Many people visit Hindu pilgrimage sites to perform, Śrāddha ceremonies, like Gaya, Pehowa, Kurukshetra, Haridwar, Gokarneshwar, Nashik etc. where they also update their genealogy registers maintained by pandas.

 Hindu genealogy registers at Chintpurni, Himachal Pradesh
 Hindu genealogy registers at Haridwar
 Hindu genealogy registers at Jawalamukhi,Himachal Pradesh
 Hindu genealogy registers at Kurukshetra, Haryana
 Hindu genealogy registers at Peohwa, Haryana
 Hindu genealogy registers at Trimbakeshwar, Maharashtra
 Hindu genealogy registers at Varanasi

Observance by Hindu communities outside India and Nepal

Trinidad and Tobago

Hindus brought into Trinidad and Tobago as indentured laborers for plantations between 1845 and 1917, by the British colonial government, suffered discriminatory laws that did not allow cremation, and other rites of passage such as the traditional marriage, because the colonial officials considered these as pagan and uncivilized barbaric practices. The non-Hindu government further did not allow the construction of a crematorium. After decades of social organization and petitions, the Hindus of Trinidad gained the permission to practice their traditional rites of passage including Antyesti in the 1950s, and build the first crematorium in 1980s.

United Kingdom

In the United Kingdom, it was formerly illegal to conduct a traditional outdoors Hindu cremation under the 1902 Cremation Act, with Hindus having to cremate their dead in indoor crematoriums instead. In 2006, Daven Ghai, a British Hindu who had been refused the right to have a traditional funeral by Newcastle City Council, brought a case to court in which he claimed that the current law did in fact allow open air cremations, so long as they were in some enclosed building and away from the public. A High Court ruling disagreed with his claim, and the-then Justice Secretary Jack Straw stated that the British public would "find it abhorrent that human remains were being burned in this way." Nonetheless, upon taking it to the Court of Appeals in 2010, the judge, Lord Justice Neuberger, ruled that such a cremation would be legal under the 1902 Act, so long as it was performed within a building, even an open-air one. Upon his victory, Ghai told reporters that "I always maintained that I wanted to clarify the law, not disobey or disrespect it" and expressed regret at the amount that the trial had cost the taxpayer. He stated that he was thankful that he now had "the right to be cremated with the sun shining on my body and my son lighting the pyre" and he and other Hindus and Sikhs in the country had begun investigations into finding a site upon which they could perform the funerary ceremonies.

See also

 Antam Sanskar
 Cremation in the Christian World
 Cemetery H culture
 Raj Ghat and associated memorials
 Sanskara (rite of passage)

References

Further reading
S. P. Gupta: Disposal of the Dead and Physical Types in Ancient India (1971)

External links
The Logic of Cremation in Indic Contexts: An Anthropological Analysis, Roger Ballard, United Kingdom, A High Court of Justice ordered analysis of the demand for a right to traditional Hindu and Sikh cremation ritual in the United Kingdom (2006), with Addendum and Supplementary submissions to the Court, Heidelberg University Archive
My father's Hindu funeral Tanith Carey, The Guardian (2011)

Samskaras
Hindu rituals related to death
Funerals in Nepal